The Space Pen (also known as the Zero Gravity Pen), marketed by Fisher Space Pen Company, is a pen that uses pressurized ink cartridges and is able to write in zero gravity, underwater, over wet and greasy paper, at any angle, and in a very wide range of temperatures.

Inventors
The Fisher Space Pen was created by Austrian Friedrich Schächter and expanded by Erwin Rath. Paul C. Fisher invented the "thixotropic special ink". The pens were manufactured in Boulder City, Nevada. Paul C. Fisher first patented the AG7 "anti-gravity" pen in 1965.

Models
There are two prominent styles of the pen: the AG7 "Astronaut pen", a long thin retractable pen shaped like a common ballpoint, and the "Bullet pen" which is non-retractable, shorter than standard ballpoints when capped, but full size when the cap is posted on the rear for writing.

Several of the Fisher Space Pen models (the "Millennium" is one) are claimed to write for a lifetime of "average" use; however, the product literature states that the pen will write exactly .

Standard Space Pen refills can be used in any pen able to take a standard Parker-type ballpoint refill, using the small plastic adapter that is supplied with each refill. Fisher also makes a Space Pen-type refill that fits Cross pens, one that fits 1950s-style Papermate pens (or any pen that uses that type of refill), and a "universal" refill that fits some other ballpoint pens.

Technology
The ballpoint is made from tungsten carbide and is precisely fitted in order to avoid leaks. A sliding float separates the ink from the pressurized gas. The thixotropic visco-elastic ink in the hermetically sealed and pressurized reservoir is able to write for three times longer than a standard ballpoint pen. The pen can write without the help of gravity, at any angle. The pen has an estimated shelf life of 100 years.

One of the first Space Pen patents is US3285228, which was filed on 19 May 1965.

Uses in the U.S. and Russian space programs

An urban legend states that NASA spent a large amount of money to develop a pen that would write in space (the result purportedly being the Fisher Space Pen), while the Soviets just used pencils.  In reality, NASA began to develop a space pen, but when development costs skyrocketed the project was abandoned and astronauts went back to using pencils, along with the Soviets.  However, the claim that NASA spent millions on the Space Pen is incorrect, as the Fisher pen was developed using private capital, not government funding. The development of the thixotropic ink cost Paul Fisher around $1 million (equivalent to $ in ). NASA – and the Soviets – eventually began purchasing such pens.

NASA programs previously used pencils (for example a 1965 order of mechanical pencils) but because of the substantial dangers that broken pencil tips and graphite dust pose to electronics in zero gravity, the flammable nature of wood present in pencils, and the inadequate quality documentation produced by non-permanent or smeared recordkeeping, a better solution was needed.  Russian cosmonauts used pencils, and grease pencils on plastic slates until also adopting a space pen in 1969 with a purchase of 100 units for use on all future missions.  NASA never approached Paul Fisher to develop a pen, nor did Fisher receive any government funding for the pen's development. Fisher invented it independently and then, in 1965, asked NASA to try it. After extensive testing, NASA decided to use the pens in future Apollo missions. Subsequently, in 1967 it was reported that NASA purchased approximately 400 pens for $2.95 apiece (equivalent to $ each in ).

In 2008, Gene Cernan's Apollo 17-flown space pen sold in a Heritage auction for US$23,900.

See also
 List of pen types, brands and companies

References

External links
Fisher Space Pen Co.
The Billion Dollar Space Pen
Legend debunked (Urban Legends Reference Pages)
Did Biros really revolutionise writing BBC News 2006-11-23
NASA Specification for writing instruments 1973-06
Nasa History
"Pen Name: Having perfected the ball-point, Paul Fisher wrote a plan to save the world" , by Anthony DeBartolo, Chicago Tribune Sunday Magazine, 1991

American inventions
Pens
Urban legends